East Midlands/Leicestershire 1 (formerly East Midlands/Leicestershire) was a tier 9 English Rugby Union league with teams from Bedfordshire, parts of Cambridgeshire, Leicestershire and Northamptonshire taking part.  Promoted teams moved up to Midlands 4 East (North) (formerly Midlands East 2) and relegated teams dropped to East Midlands/Leicestershire 2.

At the end of the 1999–00 season the East Midlands/Leicestershire leagues split.  Most teams in East Midlands/Leicestershire 1 were transferred into either Midlands 4 East (South) or Notts, Lincs & Derbyshire/Leicestershire 1 East.

Original teams

When league rugby began in 1987 this division (then known as East Midlands/Leicestershire) contained the following teams:

Aylestone St James
Bedford Athletic
Long Buckby
Luton
Melton Mowbray
Northampton Trinity Old Boys
Oadby Wyggestonian
Old Northamptonians
South Leicester
Stewart & Lloyds
Towcestrians

East Midlands/Leicestershire 1 honours

East Midlands/Leicestershire (1987–1992)

Originally known as East Midlands/Leicestershire, it was a tier 7 league with promotion to Midlands 2 East and relegation to either East Midlands 1 or Leicestershire 1.

East Midlands/Leicestershire 1 (1992–1993)

Restructuring saw the division renamed as East Midlands/Leicestershire 1, dropping two levels to become a tier 9 league.  Promotion and relegation was now to the newly introduced Midlands East 2 and East Midlands/Leicestershire 2.

East Midlands/Leicestershire 1 (1993–1996)

The top six teams from Midlands 1 and the top six from North 1 were combined to create National 5 North, meaning that East Midlands/Leicestershire 1 dropped another level to become a tier 10 league.  Promotion continued to Midlands East 2 and relegation to East Midlands/Leicestershire 2.

East Midlands/Leicestershire 1 (1996–1998)

At the end of the 1995–96 season National 5 North was discontinued and East Midlands/Leicestershire 1 returned to being a tier 9 league.  Promotion continued to Midlands East 2 while relegation was now to East Midlands or Leicestershire 1.

East Midlands/Leicestershire 1 (1998–2000)

East Midlands/Leicestershire remained a tier 9 league for the 1998–99 season.  Promotion continued to Midlands East 2 but relegation was to the reintroduced East Midlands/Leicestershire 2.  At the end of the 1999–00 campaign the league was cancelled and teams either transferred into the new Midlands 4 East (South) and Notts, Lincs & Derbyshire/Leicestershire 1 East divisions or dropping out of the league system altogether.

Number of league titles

Bedford Athletic (1)
Biggleswade (1)
Hinckley (1)
Huntingdon & District (1)
Leicester Forest (1)
Luton (1)
Market Bosworth (1)
Kibworth (1)
Melton Mowbray (1)
Northampton Men's Own (1)
Old Northamptonians (1)
Stewart & Lloyds (1)
Towcestrians (1)

Notes

See also
East Midlands/Leicestershire 2
East Midlands/Leicestershire 3
East Midlands/Leicestershire 4
Midlands RFU
East Midlands RFU
Leicestershire RU
English rugby union system
Rugby union in England

References

External links
 East Midlands Rugby Union official website
Leicestershire Rugby Union website

9
Rugby union in Bedfordshire
Rugby union in Cambridgeshire
Rugby union in Leicestershire
Rugby union in Northamptonshire
Sports leagues established in 1987
Sports leagues disestablished in 2000